The Proserpine rock-wallaby (Petrogale persephone) is a species of rock-wallaby restricted to a small area in Conway National Park, Dryander National Park, Gloucester Island National Park, and around the town of Airlie Beach, all in Whitsunday Shire in Queensland, Australia. It is a threatened species, being classified by the IUCN as endangered.

The Proserpine rock-wallaby is mostly grey in colour and is a timid grass-eater that rarely ventures far from rock shelter. It is distinguished from the many other rock wallabies found in northeastern Queensland by its larger size and longer tail, tipped with white. It was unknown to science until 1977, when a single individual was captured after farmers at Proserpine had spoken of a strange form of rock wallaby in the area.

The Proserpine rock-wallaby is found only in a relatively intensively-settled area, but it is in competition with other more successful rock-wallaby species, which competition is probably responsible for its threatened status.

References

External links
Australian Department of Environment and Heritage Species Profiles
Animal Info on the Proserpine rock-wallaby
https://web.archive.org/web/20070219182919/http://www.jcu.edu.au/school/tbiol/zoology/auxillry/mammals/prossy.htm (includes photos)

Macropods
Mammals of Queensland
Endangered fauna of Australia
Marsupials of Australia
Nature Conservation Act endangered biota
Mammals described in 1982